Merle Calvin Ricklefs  (17 July 1943 – 29 December 2019) was an American-born Australian scholar of the history and current affairs of Indonesia.

Ricklefs was born in Fort Dodge, Iowa, on 17 July 1943 and died on 29 December 2019, aged 76.

Ricklefs received his Ph.D. with his dissertation titled "Jogjakarta under Sultan Mangkubumi (1749-1792)" from Cornell University in 1973, under the supervision of O. W. Wolters. He held positions at the School of Oriental and African Studies, All Souls College, Monash University, the Australian National University and the University of Melbourne. He retired from the professorship of Southeast Asian history at the National University of Singapore. He was emeritus professor of history at both the Australian National University and Monash University.

Academic career
Ricklef's publications focused on the history of Mataram, Kartasura, Yogyakarta, Surakarta (locations in Central Java). He also regularly updated his history of Indonesia, A History of Modern Indonesia, ca. 1300 to the present.

Honours and awards

In 1989, Ricklefs was elected a fellow of the Australian Academy of the Humanities.

The Government of Australia awarded him in 2001 the Centenary Medal for "service to Australian society and the humanities in the study of Indonesia".

In June 2017, Ricklefs was made a member of the Order of Australia.

Civil and human rights activity
In the early 1980s Ricklefs became deeply involved in education for indigenous Australians, acting as the driving force behind and co-founding the Monash Orientation Scheme for Aborigines, the first bridging program for Aboriginal people in an Australian university. This aimed to prepare Aboriginal students, who suffered from great educational disadvantage, for university study.  The scheme was a runaway success and by the time Ricklefs left Monash in 1993 it had been responsible for roughly doubling the number of Aboriginal university graduates.

Ricklefs was also involved in the 1980s ‘immigration debate’ in Australia, which was sparked when his counterpart at the University of Melbourne, Geoffrey Blainey, argued that Australia should limit Asian immigration.

Publications
Major publications
Sole-authored books

 Jogjakarta under Sultan Mangkubumi, 1749–1792: A history of the division of Java. New York: Oxford University Press, 1974.
  Yogyakarta di bawah Sultan Mangkubumi, 1749-1792: Sejarah pembagian Jawa. Transl. Hartono Hadikusumo & E. Setiyawati Alkhatab. Ed. Revianto Budi Santosa. (Revised Indonesian edition of Jogjakarta under Sultan Mangkubumi.)
 Modern Javanese historical tradition: A study of an original Kartasura chronicle and related materials. London: School of Oriental and African Studies, 1978.
 A history of modern Indonesia, ca. 1300 to the present. Basingstoke: Macmillan Press, 1993.
 War, culture and economy in Java, 1677–1726: Asian and European imperialism in the early Kartasura period. Sydney: Asian Studies Association of Australia in association with Allen & Unwin, 1993.
 The seen and unseen worlds in Java, 1726–49: History, literature and Islam in the court of Pakubuwana II. New South Wales: Asian Studies Association of Australia in association with Allen & Unwin and University of Hawaii Press, 1998.

Co-authored book

 Indonesian manuscripts in Great Britain: A catalogue of manuscripts in Indonesian languages in British public collections by M. C. Ricklefs and P. Voorhoeve. London Oriental Bibliographies, vol. 5.
 Indonesian manuscripts in Great Britain: A catalogue of manuscripts in Indonesian languages in British public collections; New edition with addenda et corrigenda by M.C. Ricklefs, P. Voorhoeve† and Annabel Teh Gallop. Jakarta:
Co-authored and edited books

Edited and translated book

 Pantheism and monism in Javanese suluk literature: Islamic and Indian mysticism in an Indonesian setting

References

External links
Homepage at National University of Singapore
Biography at Australian Academy of Humanities
Biography at University of Melbourne Law School
Cornell University notable alumni
Professor Gareth Evans speech launching Islamisation and its Opponents
Australian Academy of Humanities Vale Merle Calvin Ricklefs AM FAHA 1943-2019
KITLV In Memoriam Professor Merle C. Ricklefs (1943-2019)

1943 births
2019 deaths
Historians of Southeast Asia
Cornell University alumni
Academic staff of the National University of Singapore
Javanists
Academics of SOAS University of London
Academic staff of Monash University
Academic staff of the Australian National University
Academic staff of the University of Melbourne
Australian historians
Indonesianists
Members of the Order of Australia
Fellows of the Australian Academy of the Humanities
History Today people
American emigrants to Australia
People from Fort Dodge, Iowa
Writers from Iowa
20th-century American male writers
21st-century Australian male writers
20th-century Australian male writers
Historians of Indonesia